The World was a newspaper published in Hobart, Tasmania, Australia.
It was created by the amalgamation of Daily Post (Hobart) and The Clipper.

The World was published 1 July 1918 (Vol. 1, no. 1) to 31 May 1925 (Vol. 9, no. 4). The publisher was Labor Papers Limited.

The World newspaper has been digitised and is freely available at Trove.

References

External links 

 

Newspapers in Hobart, Tasmania
Defunct newspapers published in Tasmania
1918 establishments in Australia
1925 disestablishments in Australia
Newspapers on Trove
Publications disestablished in 1925
Publications established in 1918